The Journal of Japanese Studies (JJS) is the most influential journal dealing with research on Japan in the United States.  It is a multidisciplinary forum for communicating new information, new interpretations, and recent research results concerning Japan to the English-reading world.  The Journal publishes broad, exploratory articles suggesting new analyses and interpretations, substantial book reviews, and occasional symposia by Japan scholars from around the world.

JJS appears two times each year, winter and summer, with an annual total of approximately 500 pages.  It was begun in Autumn 1974 with Kenneth B. Pyle as its first editor and is now coedited by Janet Hunter and Morgan Pitelka.  Housed at the University of Washington, JJS is currently supported by the Japan Foundation and the University of Washington and by endowments from the Kyocera Corporation and the National Endowment for the Humanities. Susan Hanley, professor of Japanese Studies at the University of Washington, was a long-standing editor, for over 25 years.

The Journal of Japanese Studies is published by the Society for Japanese Studies, and its contents are available online in the Project MUSE and JSTOR databases.

References
 
  & 

Japanese studies journals
Publications established in 1974
Biannual journals
Academic journals published by learned and professional societies